The Vrbas is a major river with a length of , in western Bosnia and Herzegovina. It is a right tributary of the Sava river. The city of Banja Luka is located on the river banks.

Etymology
The word vrba means 'willow' in Serbo-Croatian, and a number of weeping willow trees adorn the river banks in Banja Luka.

It lent its name to one of the provinces (banovinas) of the Kingdom of Yugoslavia, the Vrbas Banovina.

Tributaries
The most important right tributaries are the Desna river, the Ugar, and the Vrbanja, and left: Prusačka river, Semešnica,  the Pliva, the Crna Rijeka (Black River), and the Suturlija, which are located in the middle part of the basin.

Geography
It is a right tributary of the river Sava.

Climate
Average annual rainfall is around 800 L/m2 at the mouth of the Vrbas to the Sava river and up to 1500 L/m2 in the southern part of the basin. Characteristic mean flow is around 34.6 L/s/km2. Maximum rainfall occurs in the southern parts of the Vrbas basin in the late autumn and winter months, with minimum quantities in summer, whereas the northern parts of the basin receive the largest quantities of rain during the summer months (June–July), with the maximum in November and December.

Ichthyofauna
The Vrbas basin is known for an abundant ichthyofauna, rich in species, and recreational and fly fishing are very popular on entire cours of the river. Especially important but critically endangered is huchen, variation of hucho species endemic for the river Danube basin (hence known as Danube Salmon or Danube Taimen; Lat. Hucho hucho). Of all the Vrbas tributaries only the river Vrbanja, and possibly Ugar, also retain healthy population of this endemic fish. Vrbas are headwaters are important spawning grounds for both, huchen and its prey, Common nase (Chondrostoma nasus) and Grayling (Thymallus thymallus).

Tourism and recreation
Rafting is very popular on the Vrbas. It is also one of the most popular form of recreation in Bosnia and Herzegovina. The main attraction of the area is Vrbas canyon.

In 2005, the European Championships in Rafting were held on the Vrbas and the Tara rivers in Bosnia and Herzegovina. According to the International Rafting Federation, the event was hugely successful. In May 2009 the World Rafting Championships were held again in Bosnia and Herzegovina on the Vrbas and Tara rivers.

Gallery

See also 
 Gornji Vakuf
 Bugojno
 Donji Vakuf
 Jajce
 Banja Luka
 Vrbas Oblast

References

 
Rivers of Bosnia and Herzegovina
Rafting in Bosnia and Herzegovina
Recreational fishing in Bosnia and Herzegovina
Hucho habitats in Bosnia and Herzegovina